Bourletiella hortensis is a springtail of the family Bourletiellidae. The species common name is garden springtail.

References

External links

Collembola
Arthropods of Australia